Acari is a group of arachnids containing ticks and mites.

Acari may also refer to:

 Acarí District, a district in Peru
 Acarí, the capital of Acarí District
 Professor Acari, a fictional character in the animated series Kim Possible
 Acari, Rio Grande do Norte, a municipality in Rio Grande do Norte, Brazil
 Acari River (Rio de Janeiro), a river in the city of Rio de Janeiro, Brazil